This was the first edition of the tournament.

Wesley Koolhof and Matwé Middelkoop won the title, defeating Philipp Oswald and Adil Shamasdin in the final, 5–7, 7–6(11–9), [10–6].

Seeds

Draw

Draw

References
 Main Draw

Sofia Open
Sofia Open